Clanculus pini is a species of sea snail, a marine gastropod mollusk in the family Trochidae, the top snails.

Description
The size of the shell attains 11 mm.

Distribution
This species occurs in the Atlantic Ocean off Senegal.

References

External links

pini
Gastropods described in 2002